Built by the Engineering Department of the Port Authority of Jamaica, Lover's Leap Lighthouse is Jamaica's most recent. It is powered by three different power sources: a generator, electricity and a set of batteries.

It is the highest lighthouse in the Western Hemisphere being located at the top of a spectacular vertical cliff; the surrounding area has been developed as a tourist attraction, with a restaurant and observation deck near the lighthouse.

It is maintained by the Port Authority of Jamaica, an agency of the Ministry of Transport and Works, and is on the list of designated National Heritage Sites in Jamaica.

See also

List of lighthouses in Jamaica

References

External links
 Aerial view.
 Photos:    .

Lighthouses in Jamaica
Buildings and structures in Saint Elizabeth Parish